The Rockaway Boulevard station is a station on the IND Fulton Street Line of the New York City Subway. Located at the intersection of Rockaway Boulevard, Woodhaven and Cross Bay Boulevards, and Liberty Avenue in Ozone Park, Queens, it is served by the A train at all times.

History
Rockaway Boulevard was one of the six stations along Liberty Avenue in Queens, from 80th Street through Ozone Park–Lefferts Boulevard, as well as the current three track elevated structure, built for the BMT Fulton Street Line in 1915 as part of BMT's portion of the Dual Contracts.

On April 8, 1928, two eastbound trains crashed in the station, killing one person and injuring 30.

The connection to the BMT was severed on April 26, 1956, and the IND was extended east (railroad south) from Euclid Avenue via a connecting tunnel and new intermediate station at Grant Avenue, with the new service beginning on April 29, 1956. Two months later, a connection to the IND Rockaway Line was provided on June 26, 1956, replacing the Long Island Rail Road's long-troubled Rockaway Beach Branch.

The station was completely renovated in 2015. In 2019, as part of an initiative to increase the accessibility of the New York City Subway system, the MTA announced that it would install elevators at the Rockaway Boulevard station as part of the MTA's 2020–2024 Capital Program. In November 2022, the MTA announced that it would award a $965 million contract for the installation of 21 elevators across eight stations, including Rockaway Bouelvard. A joint venture of ASTM and Halmar International would construct the elevators under a public-private partnership.

Station layout

This station has two side platforms and three tracks. The center track is not used in revenue service. The platforms have beige windscreens and green and brown canopies.

This is the outermost station from Manhattan that is shared by all A train branches. Just past the east end of the platforms, the line splits into two routes. Trains heading to Lefferts Boulevard continue east along Liberty Avenue, while those heading to the Rockaways diverge south to bypass Aqueduct Racetrack on an embankment before lowering to run at-grade towards Conduit Avenue, Howard Beach, Jamaica Bay, Broad Channel, and then the Rockaways.

Exits
This station has two station-houses with the full-time one at the west (railroad north) end. Single staircases from each platform go down to the elevated station-house beneath the tracks. Inside are a turnstile bank and token booth. Outside of fare control, two staircases lead to either side of Liberty Avenue at Woodhaven/Cross Bay Boulevard.

The other station-house at the east (railroad south) end is also elevated and beneath the tracks, but unstaffed. It contains two HEET turnstiles, a staircase to each platform, and two staircases to either side of Liberty Avenue at 96th Street. The wooden staircase landings have a high exit-only turnstile to allow passengers to exit the system without having to go through the station.

References

External links

 
 Station Reporter — A Lefferts
 Station Reporter — A Rockaway
 The Subway Nut — Rockaway Boulevard Pictures
 94th Street/Rockaway Boulevard entrance from Google Maps Street View
 96th Street/Cross Bay Boulevard — Woodhaven Boulevard entrance from Google Maps Street View
 Platforms from Google Maps Street View

IND Fulton Street Line stations
BMT Fulton Street Line stations
New York City Subway stations in Queens, New York
Railway stations in the United States opened in 1915
1917 establishments in New York City
1915 establishments in New York City
Ozone Park, Queens